Joan Darling (née Kugell; born April 14, 1935, Boston, Massachusetts, United States) is an American actress, film and television director and a dramatic arts instructor.

Biography

Born Joan Kugell in Boston, Darling began her career with the New York improvisational theater troupe "Premise Players," and soon graduated to off-Broadway and Broadway productions. She gravitated to feature films making her debut in Theodore J. Flicker's The Troublemaker (1964) and later his The President's Analyst.  She went into television in the 1970s. She was a regular on the law series Owen Marshall, Counselor at Law, playing office secretary to Arthur Hill, Lee Majors, and David Soul.

Darling was the first woman nominated for an Emmy for directing. She was nominated four times, winning one. She was nominated two times for a Directors Guild of America award, winning one. She was nominated for an Emmy for her performance of Dorothy Parker in Woven in a Crazy Plaid.

Darling directed episodes of the television series Rhoda, Doc, Taxi, Hizzonner, The Mary Tyler Moore Show, Mary Hartman, Mary Hartman, Magnum, P.I., Steven Spielberg's Amazing Stories, and The Bionic Woman, as well as the feature film The Check Is in the Mail, and a number of television movies. She directed the famous "Chuckles Bites the Dust" episode of The Mary Tyler Moore Show and received a 1976 Emmy nomination for her efforts.

In 1976, she broke new ground when she directed the feature film First Love. At the time, Darling was part of a small circle of women directors to direct a major Hollywood studio feature film.

Personal life
Darling was married three times. Her first husband was physicist Robert Klein; her second was folk musician Erik Darling, and her present husband is Bill Svanoe, a writer and a professor at UNC-Chapel Hill.

Partial filmography as director
 Steven Spielberg's Amazing Stories (TV series)
 Magnum, P.I. (TV series)
 Taxi (TV series)
 First Love (1977 feature film)
 M* A* S* H (TV series)
 Mary Hartman, Mary Hartman (TV series)
 Phyllis (TV series)
 The Mary Tyler Moore Show (TV series)
 Rhoda (TV series)
 ‘’a.k.a.Pablo’’ (TV series)

References

External links
 

1935 births
American film directors
American stage actresses
American television actresses
American television directors
American women television directors
Living people
Actresses from Boston
Directors Guild of America Award winners
21st-century American women